Sandy Paillot (born 27 February 1987) is a French footballer who plays for FC Fleury 91. His primary position on the pitch is defender.

Club career
Paillot was promoted to the Lyon first team for the 2007–08 Ligue 1 season. He was given the squad number 32, but later changed to 15. He made his club debut in Lyon's preseason tour of South Korea, as the club took part in the Peace Cup, and appeared in all four matches.

In the season, Paillot appeared in Lyon's 4–0 victory over Ligue 2 side US Créteil in the French Cup, on 6 January 2008, as a substitute. He made his first team debut on 23 January, in Lyon's 2–0 win over FC Lorient, again subbing in. On 31 January, Paillot joined Ligue 2 outfit Grenoble Foot 38, on loan for the remainder of the season. After returning to Lyon, it was announced that Grenoble were looking to secure Paillot on another loan deal. After weeks of speculation, it was finally announced that Paillot would return to Grenoble on loan, this time for the entire 2008–09 season. In 2009 he joined the club on a four-year contract.

When Grenoble were liquidated in the summer of 2011, Paillot was without a club until signing a short term contract for SAS Épinal in December. After a good half-season, he left Épinal, but his search for another club was hampered by an injury whilst on trial with FC Metz. Eventually he re-signed with Épinal for another half-season in December 2012.

In the summer of 2013 Paillot signed a contract with FC Rouen, but the club filed for bankruptcy before the season started, and in August Paillot signed a one-year contract with newly promoted Championnat National side Paris FC. Not retained by Paris FC, Paillot was without a club until signing for Championnat de France Amateur side Limoges FC in October 2014.

In June 2015 Paillot joined SO Cholet.

In January 2019, he moved to FC Fleury 91.

International career
Paillot was a unanimous selection to the French U-20 squad that participated in the 2007 Toulon Youth Festival. He remained eligible to participate in 2009 UEFA U-21 Championships, however he has yet to receive a call-up during the qualification phase. He did, however, receive his first cap and call-up to the France U-21 squad participating in a friendly against the Czech Republic.

Honours

Club
2007 Peace Cup winner
Trophée des Champions: 2007

International
2007 Toulon Tournament winner

References

External links
 Profile at L'Équipe
 Profile at Soccerway
 Profile at Eurosport UK

1987 births
Living people
Association football defenders
French footballers
Olympique Lyonnais players
Grenoble Foot 38 players
SAS Épinal players
Paris FC players
Limoges FC players
SO Cholet players
Ligue 1 players
Ligue 2 players
Championnat National players
France under-21 international footballers